Marianne Dubuc (born October 19, 1983) is a Canadian former competitive figure skater. She won several ISU Junior Grand Prix medals and later competed on the senior Grand Prix series.

In 1997, she broke her leg in practice while performing a triple Salchow.

Programs

Competitive highlights 
GP: Grand Prix; JGP: Junior Grand Prix

References

External links 
 

1983 births
Canadian female single skaters
Living people
People from Victoriaville
Sportspeople from Quebec
20th-century Canadian women
21st-century Canadian women